Lawrence E. Lockman is an American lumber worker, lobbyist and political activist from Amherst, Maine, who has served as a Republican member of the Maine House of Representatives since 2012. In 2020, Lockman ran for the Maine State Senate, challenging incumbent state Senator Kimberly Rosen in the Republican primary.

Background 
Lockman is a 1967 graduate of Philadelphia-Montgomery Christian Academy in Jenkintown, Pennsylvania. He studied liberal arts at Covenant College in Lookout Mountain, Georgia and Pasadena City College in California. Around 1976, he began working at a sawmill in Passadumkeag, Maine.

Controversies 
In 1975, Lockman stopped paying federal and state income taxes and founded a group called Maine Patriots which put forth various tax protester arguments and urged other Mainers to follow his example.

In the mid-to-late 1980s, Lockman switched his emphasis to activism about HIV, the AIDS epidemic, and homosexuality. In a letter to the Lewiston Daily Sun, Lockman wrote "Clearly the practice of sodomy is learned behavior, and those addicted to this form of biologically-insane sex are at high risk for all manner of serious medical problems."

In 1986 and 1988, Lockman ran in District 143 of the Maine House of Representatives against the incumbent Democrat Michael Michaud. He lost both, finishing with 639 votes to Michaud's 2,438.

In 1991, Lockman became one of the directors of the Pro Life Education Association, a Maine-based anti abortion organization.

In a 1995 op-ed, Lockman warned of a "secret gay affirmative action plan," claiming "You can bet the rent money they will demand that employers set up goals and timetables to achieve 10 percent homosexual representation in the workforce and in government contracts."

In a 1995 letter in the Sun Journal in Lewiston, a reader quoted a press statement by Lockman, then part of the Pro Life Education Association, saying, “If a woman has (the right to an abortion), why shouldn’t a man be free to use his superior strength to force himself on a woman? At least the rapist’s pursuit of sexual freedom doesn’t (in most cases) result in anyone’s death.” 

In 2012, Lockman was elected to the House's District 30, which included portions of Hancock and Washington counties, with 2188 votes to 2082 for Democrat Dennis Mahar. He was a strong supporter of Maine's governor Paul LePage, who was challenged for re-election in the 2014 race by Lockman's previous opponent, Michael Michaud (who in 2013 came out as gay) LePage was succeeded by Democrat Janet Mills in 2018.

Response to controversy 
Lockman has released a statement saying "I have always been passionate about my beliefs, and years ago I said things that I regret. I hold no animosity toward anyone by virtue of their gender or sexual orientation, and today I am focused on ensuring freedom and economic prosperity for all Mainers."

Personal life 
In 1990, Lockman was part of a group seeking to break the union at the Passadumkeag Stud Mill where he worked, a drive which was defeated by an 81 to 18 vote. He had worked there for sixteen years before leaving in 1992 to work as a territory manager in eastern Maine for the National Federation of Independent Business, a position he held until 2010. He now works as a territory manager in eastern and central Maine for National Write Your Congressman.

Lockman and his wife Debbie were married in 1974. They have four adult children and five grandchildren.

References

External links 
Lockman's official House website

Year of birth missing (living people)
Living people
American political activists
Republican Party members of the Maine House of Representatives
People from Hancock County, Maine
People from Penobscot County, Maine
American tax resisters
American anti-abortion activists
Businesspeople from Maine
21st-century American politicians